

Events

Television
13 January – Australian children's live-action and puppet series The Maestro's Company begins on Network 0/28.
11 February – Ray Martin takes over Mike Walsh's old daytime slot, replacing The Mike Walsh Show with Midday with Ray Martin. The Mike Walsh Show continues and moves to 10:30pm weekdays as a late night talk show until Walsh departs the network in November .
18 February – Network 0/28 becomes known as SBS.
22 February – Seven Network screens a late night sketchy comedy series called The Eleventh Hour featuring a number of performers who later appear in The Comedy Company and Fast Forward.
4 March – The ABC launches a one-hour news and current affairs program called The National as a replacement for the traditional 7:00pm state-based news bulletins as well as its former current affairs program Nationwide. The new format, costing the national broadcaster a budgeted $25 million, turned out to be an expensive failure and lasted less than twelve months.
18 March – Neighbours premieres on the Seven Network. Six months later Neighbours is axed by HSV-7, but Network Ten bought the rights and picks up the soap and it becomes a massive hit for them.
24 March – Seven Network broadcasts Donald Duck's 50th Birthday a television special from The Wonderful World of Disney which celebrates the 50th anniversary of the world's famous cartoon character. It will first air on television for Australian viewers on Seven in Victoria that year and on Network Ten in New South Wales on 30 May 1987 and on Seven in Victoria again on 19 July the same year.
25 March – Neighbours debuts in Brisbane.
22 April – The 1980 film The Blues Brothers starring John Belushi and Dan Aykroyd premieres on the Seven Network.
8 June – Hey Hey It's Saturday moves to 6:30pm Saturdays. Then Hey Hey It's Saturday Night rebrands back to its original title.
30 June – SBS expands to Brisbane, Adelaide, Newcastle, Wollongong and the Gold Coast.
13–14 July – ABC televises the worldwide Live Aid event, featuring concerts held around the world.
August – The AUSSAT satellites are launched. The ABC will start its test transmission of its TV and radio networks via satellite in October to remote areas in rural Australia. The ABC service is officially inaugurated in January 1986.
24 October – The ABC Board has elected to abandon The National.

Debuts
13 January – The Maestro's Company (SBS)
14 January – Possession (Nine Network)
26 January – The Early Bird Show (Network Ten)
4 February – The Cartoon Connection (Channel Seven)
6 February – The Italians (ABC)
11 February – Midday (Nine Network)
22 February – The Eleventh Hour (Channel Seven)
4 March – The National (ABC)
4 March – The Cowra Breakout (Network Ten)
4 March – News Overnight (Channel Seven)
6 March – The Investigators (ABC)
7 March - Pressure Point (ABC)
7 March - The Fast Lane (ABC)
18 March – Neighbours (Channel Seven in 1985, Network Ten from 1986 onwards)
29 March – Friday Night Football (AFL) (Channel Seven)
17 April – It's a Knockout (Network Ten)
9 May – The Henderson Kids (Network Ten)
20 May – Now You See It (Channel Seven)
27 May – Bang Goes the Budgie (ABC)
14 June – Golden Pennies (ABC)
15 July – Butterfly Island (ABC)
16 July – Quantum (ABC)
8 August – Captain Cookaburra's Road to Discovery (ABC)
27 October – Anzacs (Nine Network)

New international programming
 5 January –  The Bounder (Channel Seven)
 5 January –  Hallelujah! (Channel Seven)
 12 January –  Rubik, the Amazing Cube (Network Ten)
 20 January –  Sorrell and Son (ABC)
 4 February –  V (1984) (Network Ten)
 7 February –  Duty Free (Channel Seven)
 13 February –  Spitting Image (Nine Network)
 22 February – / Joni Jones (SBS)
 26 February –  The Cosby Show (Nine Network)
 28 February –  Mickey Spillane's Mike Hammer (Stacy Keach) (Channel Seven)
 4 March –  Bananaman (ABC)
 9 March –  Terrahawks (Channel Seven)
 22 March –  Chocky (ABC)
 24 March –  Donald Duck's 50th Birthday (Channel Seven - Melbourne)
 4 April –  The Edison Twins (Nine Network)
 22 April –  Danger: Marmalade At Work (ABC)
 22 April –  Fresh Fields (ABC)
 29 April –   Going Great (Nine Network)
 29 April – / Ulysses 31 (ABC)
 3 May –  Chocky's Children (ABC)
 6 May –  Spacewatch (ABC)
 6 May –  The Wind in the Willows (1985) (ABC)
 6 May –  Barbara's World of Horses and Ponies (ABC)
 9 May –   Murder, She Wrote (Nine Network)
 25 May –  Ken Hom's Chinese Cookery (SBS)
 14 June  One by One (ABC)
 14 June –  Sharon and Elsie (ABC)
 5 July –  Time Out (SBS)
 13 July –  The Biskitts (Nine Network)
 14 July –  Muppet Babies (Network Ten)
 15 July –  Just Good Friends (ABC)
 16 July –  The Young Ones (ABC)
 19 July –  The Little Rascals (Channel Seven)
 20 July –  Monchhichis (Nine Network)
 31 July –  Swallows and Amazons Forever! (ABC)
 5 August –  The Voyages of Doctor Dolittle (ABC)
 9 August –  Children of the Dog Star (ABC)
 10 August –  Alvin and the Chipmunks (Ruby-Spears version) (Network Ten)
 15 August –  Home to Roost (Channel Seven)
 7 September –  Goldie Gold and Action Jack (Network Ten)
 9 September –  Pink Panther and Sons (Network Ten)
 10 September –  Mistral's Daughter (Nine Network) 
 12 September –  Miami Vice (Nine Network)
 16 September –  Eyes (SBS)
 16 September –  Dungeons and Dragons (Channel Seven)
 5 October –  Dragon's Lair (Network Ten)
 8 October –  Expedition Adam 84 (ABC)
 8 October –  Winter Sunlight (ABC)
 29 October – / Voltron: Defender of the Universe (ABC)
 31 October –  Sea of Faith (ABC)
 11 November –  Cover Up (Channel Seven)
 11 November –  Double Dare (1985) (Channel Seven)
 11 November –  Charles in Charge (Channel Seven)
 12 November –  Oh Madeline (Nine Network)
 12 November –  Off the Rack (Nine Network)
 12 November –  Jessie (Channel Seven)
 13 November –  50/50 (Nine Network)
 19 November –  Glitter (Network Ten)
 21 November –  Moving (ABC)
 22 November –  Kate & Allie (Channel Seven)
 23 November –  She-Ra: Princess of Power (Channel Seven)
 25 November -  Finder of Lost Loves (Network Ten)
 27 November –  Hot Pursuit (Channel Seven)
 16 December –  Blott on the Landscape (ABC)
 23 December –  Eye to Eye (Nine Network)
 30 December –  Two Marriages (Channel Seven)
 31 December –  The Max Headroom Show (ABC)
 / Snorks (Nine Network - Adelaide)
  Willo the Wisp (ABC)
  The Adventures of Portland Bill (ABC)

Changes to network affiliation
This is a list of programs which made their premiere on an Australian television network that had previously premiered on another Australian television network. The networks involved in the switch of allegiances are predominantly both free-to-air networks or both subscription television networks. Programs that have their free-to-air/subscription television premiere, after previously premiering on the opposite platform (free-to air to subscription/subscription to free-to air) are not included. In some cases, programs may still air on the original television network. This occurs predominantly with programs shared between subscription television networks.

International

Television shows

1950s
 Mr. Squiggle and Friends (1959 – 1999)

1960s
 Four Corners (1961 – present)

1970s
 Hey Hey It's Saturday (1971 – 1999, 2009 – 2010)
 Young Talent Time (1971 – 1988)
 Countdown (1974 – 1987)
 Prisoner (1979 – 1986)

1980s
 Wheel of Fortune (1981 – 2006, 2008)
 Sale of the Century (1980 – 2001)
 Sunday (1981 – 2008)
 Today (1982 – present)
 Perfect Match (1984 – 1989, 2002)
 Neighbours (1985 – present)

Ending this year

Returning this year

TV movies

See also
 1985 in Australia
 List of Australian films of 1985

References